Nivati Fort  is a fort located 10 km south of Malvan in Sindhudurg district, of Maharashtra. This fort is located on the hill near the Nivati village. The fort is spread over an area of 4-5 acres and covered with dense bushes.

History
Shivaji Maharaj built this fort immediately after the Sindhudurg fort was built. This fort was used to look over the Karli creek and the Vengurla port. This fort was later captured by Sawant of Sawantwadi. In 1748, Ismail Khan, who was working under the Portuguese, captured this fort. In 1787 Karvirkar of Kolhapur gained control of this fort. In 1803, the control of the fort passed to Sawants.  The H.M. IV Rifles of British Army captured this fort on February 4, 1818 without any resistance.

How to reach
The nearest town is Malvan which is 526 km from Mumbai. This fort is close to Nivati and Parule villages. There are direct buses from Malwan and Kudal to the Nivati Fort.

Places to see
The gates and bastion are in good state. The entire fort is protected by 20 feet wide and 10 feet deep moat. It takes about an hour to visit all places on the fort. You will get to see a great and beautiful view of sea. You can see a Light House Called 'Nivati Rock' far away in mid sea.

See also 
 List of forts in Maharashtra
 List of forts in India
 Sawantwadi State
 Marathi People
 Maratha Navy
 List of Maratha dynasties and states
 Maratha War of Independence
 Battles involving the Maratha Empire
 Maratha Army
 Maratha titles
 Military history of India
 List of people involved in the Maratha Empire

References 

Buildings and structures of the Maratha Empire
16th-century forts in India
Buildings and structures in Maharashtra
Sindhudurg district